James Edgar Leach VC (27 July 1892 – 15 August 1958) was a British Army officer and English recipient of the Victoria Cross, the highest and most prestigious award for gallantry in the face of the enemy that can be awarded to British and Commonwealth forces.

Leach was 22 years old, and a Second Lieutenant in the 2nd Battalion, The Manchester Regiment, in France during the First World War. The 2nd Manchesters formed part of 5 Division, which had crossed the Béthune–La Bassée canal and then came under heavy attack. On 29 October 1914, near Festubert, the following deed took place for which Leach and Sergeant John Hogan were awarded the VC.

Their citation reads:

Leach later achieved the rank of Captain. After the war, he served in the Auxiliary Division of the Royal Irish Constabulary. His VC is on display in the Lord Ashcroft Gallery at the Imperial War Museum, London.

References

"Captain James Leach, V.C." (obituary), The Times, London, 18 August 1958, page 10
Monuments to Courage (David Harvey, 1999)
The Register of the Victoria Cross (This England, 1997)
VCs of the First World War - 1914 (Gerald Gliddon, 1994)

External links
Location of grave and VC medal (Surrey)

1892 births
1958 deaths
British World War I recipients of the Victoria Cross
Manchester Regiment officers
British Army personnel of World War I
Royal Irish Constabulary officers
People from North Shields
British Army recipients of the Victoria Cross
Military personnel from Northumberland